Lancha can refer to:
Launch (boat), an open motorboat. Also spelled lantsa in the Philippines.
Lancang (ship), a sailing ship from the Malay Archipelago